Shell Rock Township is a township in Greenwood County, Kansas, USA.  As of the 2000 census, its population was 173.

Geography
According to the USGS, it contains one cemetery, Lena Valley.

The streams of Halderman Creek, Long Creek and Van Horn Creek run through this township.

References
 USGS Geographic Names Information System (GNIS)

External links
 US-Counties.com
 City-Data.com

Townships in Greenwood County, Kansas
Townships in Kansas